

Moshe Kochavi (1928–2008) was an Israeli archeologist and a founding faculty member of Tel Aviv University's Department of Archaeology and Near Eastern Studies.

Biography
Born in Bucharest, Romania, Kochavi (birth surname: Stern) immigrated to Palestine with his parents at the age of 5. Kochavi was drafted by the Palmach in 1947. He served in the Yiftach Brigade and was wounded during Operation Yoav.

Kochavi began studying archeology at the Hebrew University of Jerusalem in 1955 under Yohanan Aharoni, and he received his Ph.D. from that institution. After the 1967 Six-Day War Kochavi carried out the first thorough survey of the Judean Hills. In 1968 he joined Tel Aviv University's Department of Archaeology. He led Tel Aviv University's excavation at Tel Hadar between 1987 and 1995 as part of the Land of Geshur Project.

Kochavi was one of numerous archaeologists who in 2007 petitioned the Supreme Court of Israel to order an immediate cessation of digging operations being performed by the Jerusalem Islamic Waqf on the Temple Mount.

Works

See also
Archeology of Israel
Rujm el-Hiri

References

External links
Tel Aviv University – Institute of Archaeology and Department of Archaeology and Ancient Near Eastern Civilization

Israeli archaeologists
Palmach members
Romanian Jews
Romanian emigrants to Mandatory Palestine
Hebrew University of Jerusalem alumni
Academic staff of Tel Aviv University
1928 births
2008 deaths
20th-century archaeologists